This is a list of lists of space scientists.

 List of cosmologists
 List of aerospace engineers
 Astronomer Royal
 List of women astronomers
 List of astronomers
 List of French astronomers
 List of minor planet discoverers
 List of Russian astronomers and astrophysicists
 List of Russian aerospace engineers
 List of German aerospace engineers in the United States

See also 
 Lists of astronomical objects
 Lists of telescopes
 Lists of spacecraft
 SEDS
 List of government space agencies
 Lists of astronauts

External references
 A list of 15 space scientists name?, access 02/13/2019
 Famous Space Scientists, accessed 02/13/2019
 Space Scientist: Career and Salary Facts, accessed 02/13/2019
 Space Science Institute, accessed 02/13/2019